Kandage Hasantha Ruwan Kumara Fernando (born 14 October 1979), or Hasantha Fernando is a former Sri Lankan cricketer, who played two Test matches and 7 One Day Internationals. He is a right-handed batsman and a right-arm medium-fast bowler. He is a past student of Prince of Wales College, Moratuwa.

Domestic career
He made his Twenty20 debut on 17 August 2004, for Chilaw Marians Cricket Club in the 2004 SLC Twenty20 Tournament.

He was the professional at Whitehaven Cricket Club in 2006 and he topped the league bowling averages.

After losing his place in the Sri Lankan team he went to English semi-pro team Plymouth where he made them contenders in the local 50 over league until he had a surprise call up for the Sri Lankan 20/20 team and became one of their crucial reserves. Plymouth later were promoted to the top league in the westcountry after 3 of their 4 teams were promoted in the 2007 season.

In 2011 he was the professional at Sudbury CC, where he helped the club keep their East Anglian Premier League status and rejoined them in the 2012 season.

International cricket
After just one first-class season, spent with Sebastianites Cricket and Athletic Club, he impressed the selectors after having made three centuries, and was an ideal player to be picked for the 2003 Cricket World Cup. He made his one-day debut against Bangladesh, where his bowling was impressive. He was gentle in pace, but showed variation in line, length and style.

References

1979 births
Living people
Basnahira South cricketers
Sri Lanka One Day International cricketers
Sri Lanka Test cricketers
Basnahira cricketers
Chilaw Marians Cricket Club cricketers
Kandurata cricketers
Moors Sports Club cricketers